The Tales of Beatrix Potter (US title: Peter Rabbit and Tales of Beatrix Potter) is a 1971 ballet film based on the children's stories of English author and illustrator Beatrix Potter.  The film was directed by Reginald Mills, choreographed by Sir Frederick Ashton (who danced the role of Mrs. Tiggy-Winkle), and featured dancers from The Royal Ballet. The musical score was arranged by John Lanchbery from various sources, such as the operas of Michael Balfe and of Sir Arthur Sullivan, and performed by the Orchestra of the Royal Opera House. It was produced by Richard Goodwin with John Brabourne as executive producer. The stories were adapted by Goodwin and his wife designer Christine Edzard.

The Tales of Beatrix Potter is the only feature film directed by Mills, who is best remembered as a film editor. Mills edited The Red Shoes (1948) and other films directed and produced by Powell and Pressburger that incorporated ballet.

Production
The film was a passion project for producer Richard Goodwin who succeeded in getting the film rights from Potter's estate. (The estate had turned down an approach from Walt Disney because they were worried he would distort the work.) Goodwin worked on developing the film for two years with his wife, designer Christine Edzard. Instead of a conventional screenplay, Edzard produced over two hundred sketches.

Goodwin approached Ashton to choreograph. He later said: "I was not certain that with films dominated by violence and sex the time was right for such an explosion of sheer charm. But now I think the public is more than ready for something like this."

The film was given the go ahead by Bryan Forbes during his period as head of production at EMI Films. He recalled that the EMI Board were not enthusiastic, and Nat Cohen had never heard of Beatrix Potter, but he had complete artistic control for any movie made with a budget under £1 million so could easily gain approval.

Producer Richard Goodwin called the film "a diversion... a souffle... it is an entertainment."

Reception

Box office
The film was one of the most successful of the Forbes regime at EMI Films. It was one of the most popular movies in 1971 at the British box office. By June 1972 it earned EMI a profit of £18,000.

Critical
A 1971 review by Roger Ebert was favourable: "The stories are told simply and directly and with a certain almost clumsy charm. Instead of going for perfection in the dancing, the Royal Ballet dancers have gone for characterizations instead. The various animals have their quirks and eccentricities, and they are fairly authentic: The frog dances like a frog, for example, and not like Nureyev." Anthony Nield wrote in 2011, "Tales of Beatrix Potter is one of British cinema's true one-offs, a film quite unlike any other. Ostensibly aimed at children, this adaptation of Potter’s various animal-centric stories was mounted by the Royal Ballet and choreographed by Sir Frederick Ashton. The tales are rendered as a series of dances, loosely interconnected by the author as a young girl (played by Érin Geraghty) and her active imagination. There are no words, only music and movement as the performers of the Royal Ballet—in full animal costume—interpret her stories' simple narratives."

The film's designer, Christine Edzard, was nominated for BAFTA awards for Best Art Direction and for Best Costume Design.

Home media
The film was released to DVD in 2004 and 2009. A digitally restored version was released as a Blu-ray DVD in 2011, in commemoration of the film's 40th anniversary.

References

External links
 
 

1971 films
Ballets created for The Royal Ballet
Beatrix Potter
British children's fantasy films
Films shot at EMI-Elstree Studios
Films based on children's books
Films without speech
Metro-Goldwyn-Mayer films
Peter Rabbit
Films about rabbits and hares
Films about owls
Films about squirrels
Films about mice and rats
Films about hedgehogs
Films about frogs
Films about ducks
Films about foxes
Films about pigs
EMI Films films
1970s English-language films
1970s British films